Son of My Father is a 1972 album composed, produced and performed by Giorgio Moroder. The tracks "Tears", "Underdog", and "Son of My Father" appeared in the 1972 film Die Klosterschülerinnen, for which Moroder also composed the score.

"Son of My Father" was later covered and popularized by the English pop group Chicory Tip.

Shirocco later reworked a version of "Tears" with vocals and released it as "Es War Nur Ein Traum".

The track "Automation" appeared in the 1972 film  Oswalt Kolle: Liebe als Gesellschaftsspiel.

Track listing
"Son of My Father" (Giorgio Moroder, Pete Bellotte, Michael Holm) – 3:42
"Lord (Release Me)" (Moroder, Bellotte) – 3:41
"That's How I See Her" (Moroder, Bellotte) – 3:13
"Pauline" (Moroder, Bellotte) – 2:54
"Automation" (Moroder, Bellotte) – 4:12
"London Traffic" (Moroder, Bellotte) – 3:49
"Underdog" (Moroder) – 3:53
"Spanish Disaster" (Moroder, Bellotte) – 5:00
"Watch Your Step" (Moroder) – 3:24
"Tears" (Moroder, Fred Daysenhof) – 2:20

Re-release bonus tracks
"Today's A Tomorrow" (Single) (Moroder, Bellotte) – 3:45 ^
"I'm Free Now" (Single) (Fausto Leali, Luciana Medini, Morris) – 2:54
"Tu Sei Mio Padre" (Italian Version of "Son Of My Father") (Single) (Moroder, Bellotte, Holm, Oscar Avogadro) – 3:20
"Non Ci Sto" (Italian Version of "Underdog") (Single) (Moroder, Bellotte, Holm, Avogadro) – 3:17
"Take It, Shake It, Break My Heart" (Single) (Moroder, Bellotte) – 3:19
"Everybody Join Hands" (Single) (Moroder, Bellotte) – 4:15
"Son Of My Father" (Part 1) (Mono Version) (Single) (Moroder, Bellotte, Holm) – 3:46
"Underdog" (Mono Version) (Single) (Moroder) – 3:54
"Watch Your Step" (Mono Version) (Single) (Moroder) – 3:22
"Son Of My Father" (Part 2 - Instrumental) (Mono Version) (Single) (Moroder, Bellotte, Holm) – 3:20

^ "Today's a Tomorrow" was also included on certain original (1972) releases of the album

Personnel
All songs written by Giorgio Moroder and/or Pete Bellotte.
Recorded at Giorgio's Musicland Studios
Engineered by Giorgio Moroder and G. Zipelius
Arranged and directed by Giorgio Moroder; Co-ordinated by Pete Bellotte
Drums and percussion: Keith Forsey
Guitars: Paul Vincent, Giorgio Moroder, Pete Bellotte. 
Keyboards: Max Gregor Jr., F. B. Mushler 
Bass: F. B. Mushler
Moog: F. B. Mushler, Giorgio Moroder 
Background vocals: Giorgio and Friends
Giorgio Moroder - Guitar and Synths

References

Giorgio Moroder albums
1972 albums
Albums produced by Giorgio Moroder
Casablanca Records albums